Auxanius was Bishop of Arles c. 543-c. 546. He was succeeded by Bishop Aurelian of Arles.  Auxanius received two letters from Pope Vigilius.  He is otherwise unknown.

Notes

References
  At Internet Archive

6th-century Frankish bishops